Edson Guilherme Mendes dos Santos (born 4 June 1997), known as Edson Carioca or Edson is a Brazilian footballer who plays for Botafogo-SP, on loan of Azuriz as a attacking midfielder, he can also play as a left winger.

Career statistics

Honours
Treze
Campeonato Paraibano: 2020

References

External links

1997 births
Living people
Brazilian footballers
Association football midfielders
Footballers from Rio de Janeiro (city)
Campeonato Brasileiro Série B players
Campeonato Brasileiro Série C players
Tombense Futebol Clube players
Rio Claro Futebol Clube players
Associação Portuguesa de Desportos players
Treze Futebol Clube players
Azuriz Futebol Clube players
Coritiba Foot Ball Club players
Guarani FC players
Botafogo Futebol Clube (SP) players